Ezekiel Tobechukwu "Zeke" Nnaji (born January 9, 2001) is an American professional basketball player for the Denver Nuggets of the National Basketball Association (NBA). He was drafted 22nd overall in the 2020 NBA draft. He played college basketball for the Arizona Wildcats.

Early life
Nnaji was born in Minneapolis. He played baseball and soccer before starting basketball due to his height. He has played the piano since first grade. Nnaji composes his own music.

High school career
Nnaji started playing high school basketball for Lakeville North High School in Lakeville, Minnesota, before transferring to Hopkins High School in Minnetonka, Minnesota. As a senior, he averaged 24.1 points and 9.4 rebounds per game and led Hopkins to a Minnesota 4A state title over Lakeville North. Nnaji had 14 points and 12 rebounds in the championship game. He played for the Adidas-sponsored D1 Minnesota club alongside Matthew Hurt. Nnaji was invited to the Iverson Classic game. Nnaji was ranked 22nd in his class and a five-star recruit by Rivals but was considered a four-star recruit by most other recruiting services. He committed to play college basketball for Arizona over offers from Kansas, Kentucky, North Carolina, and UCLA.

College career
On November 6, 2019, Nnaji made his college debut, scoring 20 points in 21 minutes to help Arizona defeat Northern Arizona, 91–52. Five days later, he was named Pac-12 Conference Freshman of the Week. Nnaji won the same award in the following week, most notably posting 26 points and 11 rebounds in an 87–39 win over San Jose State. He became the first Arizona player to score 20 points and collect 10 rebounds in his in his first three games since Brandon Ashley did so against Long Beach State in the 2012–13 season. At the conclusion of the regular season, Nnaji was named first-team All-Pac-12 and Pac-12 Freshman of the Year. Nnaji averaged 16.1 points per game on 57 percent shooting and grabbed 8.6 rebounds per game as a freshman. Following the season, he declared for the 2020 NBA draft.

Professional career

Denver Nuggets (2020–present)
Nnaji was selected with the 22nd pick in the 2020 NBA draft by the Denver Nuggets. On December 1, 2020, Nnaji signed his rookie scale contract with the Nuggets.

Career statistics

NBA

Regular season

|-
| style="text-align:left;"|
| style="text-align:left;"|Denver
| 42 || 1 || 9.5 || .481 || .407 || .800 || 1.5 || .2 || .2 || .1 || 3.2
|-
| style="text-align:left;"|
| style="text-align:left;"|Denver
| 41 || 1 || 17.0 || .516 || .463 || .631 || 3.6 || .4 || .4 || .3 || 6.6
|- class="sortbottom"
| style="text-align:center;" colspan="2"| Career
| 83 || 2 || 13.2 || .503 || .439 || .663 || 2.6 || .3 || .3 || .2 || 4.9

Playoffs

|-
| style="text-align:left;"|2021
| style="text-align:left;"|Denver
| 5 || 0 || 3.6 || .500 || .429 || .500 || .4 || .4 || .2 || .0 || 2.4
|-
| style="text-align:left;"|2022
| style="text-align:left;"|Denver
| 2 || 0 || 4.5 || 1.000 || 1.000 || — || .0 || .0 || .0 || .0 || 1.5
|- class="sortbottom"
| style="text-align:center;" colspan="2"| Career
| 7 || 0 || 3.9 || .556 || .500 || .500 || .3 || .3 || .1 || .0 || 2.1

College

|-
| style="text-align:left;"| 2019–20
| style="text-align:left;"| Arizona
| 32 || 32 || 30.7 || .570 || .294 || .760 || 8.4 || .8 || .7 || .9 || 16.1

Personal life
Nnaji's father is from Nigeria and his mother is from Minnesota. His younger sister, Maya, is a highly regarded high school basketball recruit at Hopkins High School. His uncle, Obiora Nnaji, played center at the University of Florida from 1997 to 1999.

References

External links
Arizona Wildcats bio
USA Basketball bio

2001 births
Living people
21st-century African-American sportspeople
African-American basketball players
American men's basketball players
American sportspeople of Nigerian descent
Arizona Wildcats men's basketball players
Basketball players from Minneapolis
Centers (basketball)
Denver Nuggets draft picks
Denver Nuggets players
Hopkins High School alumni
Power forwards (basketball)